Camp Becket, also known as Camp Becket-in-the-Berkshires, is a YMCA summer camp for boys in the Berkshires of western Massachusetts. Founded in 1903 by George Hannum on Rudd Pond in Becket, Massachusetts, it is one of the oldest continually operational summer camps in the United States, and is consistently rated among the best camps of its kind. The camp continues to teach core values espoused by its second director, Henry Gibson (tenure, 1904-1927).

These include the eight Becket Mottos:

 Do your best
 Play the game
 Manners maketh the man
 Peace through understanding
 I can and I will
 Each for all—all for each
 Better faithful than famous
 Help the other fellow

The camp is divided into four units, called villages, that each contain eight to ten cabins. From youngest to oldest, these are:

 Iroquois (cabins named after the American Indian tribes of the Iroquois League, and Algonquin and Erie)
 Pioneer (cabins named after famous explorers)
 Frontier (cabins named after U.S. Forts). It is also known as the Showcase Village because it is in the middle of the camp
 Ranger (cabins named after U.S. National Parks).

The cabins do not have electricity, and each village has a communal bathroom where kids shower and brush their teeth. Each cabin houses eight campers (nine in Ranger), a program staff member, an assistant counselor, and a counselor. In addition to group activities and team-building, campers engage in numerous individual activities, including sports, arts and crafts, boating, ball and team games and nature activities.

During the off-seasons, there are work weekends, during which alumni, staff, and kids participate in work activities, such as wood chip spreading or fixing roofs. An alumni weekend provides an opportunity for alumni to reconnect. All of these events are hosted at Chimney Corners Camp because of the heated and insulated cabins. Camp Becket has recently constructed a new dining hall.

Opportunities for Older Boys 
Becket offers specialty programs for older campers, such as Construction cabins, for boys interested in carpentry and building skills, and the Adventure Odyssey cabin, for boys interested in rock climbing, bouldering, and backwoods, low-impact camping. One new structure is completed each season The Adventure Odyssey blends sport climbing using a ropes course, climbing tower, various top-roped chimneys on the property, and off-site climbing locations, with off-site camping and hiking. The focus of this program is group building and leave-no-trace camping techniques.

Travel Service Programs (TSP) 
Each summer since 1963, the Becket-Chimney Corners YMCA sends teenagers around the United States and around the world. The International Camper Exchange Programs (ICEP) focus on service work and cultural exchange in Vietnam, Chile, Australia, Japan, New Zealand, China, Peru, Armenia, Uruguay and Sweden, each of which lasts for about 35 days. The REACH program sends groups to the Cheyenne River Reservation in South Dakota to do service work and learn about Native American life today. The Teen Leadership and Service (TLS) program combines biking and community service in Vermont and New York State. Yellowstone Adventure and Service (YAS) combines adventure activities and service work in Yellowstone National Park and the Grand Tetons.

Leadership in Training Programs (LIT) 
Aides Program The Aides program is an eight-and-a-half-week leader-in-training program offered to boys finishing their sophomore year in high school. Dr. Russell Irons started the current program in 1951 as the first step in the camp's leadership development program. Its participants consist of approx. 24 former Becket campers selected from a very competitive pool of applicants. A single aides director leads these boys on work projects around camp and provides guidance as the Aides develop counseling strategies. The focus of the Aides Program is to learn how a resident camp operates by assisting in the office, store, infirmary, and kitchen. Aides also partake in lifeguard training and join cabin groups to learn how to become counselors.

Service Corps The Service Corps program was formed later, during Camp Becket's centennial summer in 2003. The Service Corps, formerly a four-week program, became an eight-and-a-half-week program during the summer of 2011. There are 12 boys in the group, with one director. While the Aides spend most of their time planning large camp events and working on camp, the Service Corps do behind the scenes work and build valuable counseling skills in preparation for future work on Camp Becket's staff and help with on camp service projects. The Service Corps also do work off-campus, in soup kitchens, community farms, Habitat for Humanity, and other locations around the Berkshire community. The summer of 2013 was the final year of the program.

REACH The REACH program, which is explained more in the Chimney Corners section, used to be a co-ed program where people are trained to become counselors solely in South Dakota. As of 2012, the REACH program has become single sex, and the participants now spend part of their time working on Native American reservations in South Dakota, and the other part in Camp Becket. It has also become a six-week program.

Songs 
Becket has a tradition of singing songs in the dining hall after meals. It is an enthusiastic way in which campers and staff alike express their love for the camp.

One of the oldest and most often sung songs at Becket is Four Miles Up, sung in a gospel or traditional version:

Four Miles Up

Four miles up,

Four miles down,

Four miles away from Becket Town,

Guess it's worth the four mile tramp

With a Ra Ra Ra for Becket Camp!

Other traditional Becket songs include Becket in the Berkshires, "Oh, Sweet Becket", Sons of Noble Living, Try to Remember, Pink Pajamas, Mountain Dew, Becket Way, "Beckets for me", "Puff", "If I had a hammer", The Canoe Song, "Wyclef Jean" By American rapper and producer Young Thug off his album JEFFERY, and many songs from the Big Show. The most traditional Becket song is Amici, a song about friendship written by one of the camp directors' wives. The song is only sung after all camp activities, such as campfires and talent shows.

Notable alumni 

 Jon Lucas - writer of several screenplays, including The Hangover, Four Christmases, and Ghosts of Girlfriends Past.
 Paul Dudley White - personal physician of President Dwight D. Eisenhower
 Timothy Geithner - Former U.S. Treasury Secretary
 Welles Crowther - Equities trader who saved at least nine on 9/11. While running back into the South Tower with NYFD personnel to save more people, Welles died in the tower's collapse. Also known as "the man in the red bandana."
 Peter Sagal - Host of NPR's quiz show "Wait Wait... Don't Tell Me!"
 David Blatt - Princeton basketball star and former head coach of the Cleveland Cavaliers
 Peter Reed - Combat veteran and humanitarian bringing aid to thousands of people over numerous conflicts. Murdered February 2nd, 2023 by a Russian anti tank guided missile team while evacuating wounded in Bakhmut, Ukraine.

Chapel 
Chapel is a non religious time on Sundays when the camp gathers to discuss a topic. The topics are always about the camp values. Chapel is led by a different village every time. Several campers and counselors are chosen to give a speech on the theme. Chapel takes place in Chapel by the Lake. Chapel by the Lake is a quiet grove in the woods and is right on the lake. It consists of a number of wooden benches and one podium. It is outdoors and is one of the most important places at camp.

Chimney Corners Camp 
A photo of Chimney Corners campers from the 1930s. Part of the Becket Chimney Corners YMCA
Chimney Corners is a single-sex girl's sister camp to Camp Becket situated about a mile away, on Smith Pond. Chimney Corners offers many opportunities for young girls, including horseback riding, tennis, soccer, and many other sports and arts activities. The camp is divided into three different age groups: The Junior Unit (cabins named after famous ships), for girls ages 7–11; The Intermediate Unit (cabins named after mythical places), for girls ages 11–13; and the Senior Unit (named after constellations and goddesses), for girls ages 13–15. The camp is divided into two four week sessions, although the youngest campers have the opportunity to stay for just two weeks. Girls in the oldest age group can also participate in construction cabins and Adventure Odyssey was reinstated for Chimney Corners in 2014.

Girls older than 14 can take part in travel and service programs, then participate in the Aides Program or travel to a South Dakota Reservation in a program called REACH (Reaching, Educating and Caring for Humanity), and then become an Assistant Counselor and Counselor. Some of the oldest Chimney Corners staff members have been to the camp for over 13 years.

Initiated in 1991, the primary goal of the REACH Program is to help teens develop leadership skills through a service-oriented experience, based in a Lakota Sioux community in South Dakota. The services heighten the importance of volunteer service for the benefit of others. The REACH Program incorporates visits to pow-wows, Badlands National Park, Wounded Knee, Mount Rushmore, and the Crazy Horse Memorial.

In the southwestern corner of the Cheyenne River Reservation, participants stay in the Red Scaffold community center. Red Scaffold is a small town consisting of 15-30 homes, churches, cemeteries, and playgrounds with a population of approximately 100-150 people. REACH groups will also partner with the Sioux YMCA located in the town of Dupree.

Chimney Corners also has its own set of mottos:

Agape: Unconditional love for all of humanity

PACE: Positive Attitude Changes Everything

HELPS: Healthy Living, Empowering Girls and Women, Leadership and Learning, Positive Relationships, and Social Responsibility.

Chimney Corners is also rich with traditions. These include song and dance competitions called Wiff N' Poof and Song and Sign, a 5K color run during first session, and Chimney Palooza, a dance party run by the Aides, during second session.

Aides 
The Aides program at Chimney provides the opportunity for around 20-30 young women to connect with each other for eight-and-a-half weeks. The girls live in the Ina Gibson Lodge, or the IGL, with group leader/s. The group works to provide services for the camp such as working in the kitchen, office, camp store, and helping out with camper activities. They participate in leadership training programs, learn lifeguarding skills, and interact with campers while simultaneously maintaining camp traditions. One of these traditions is the important process of name selection. Each Aides group must come up with a name with the word "aide" in it, such as "Deviaides" or "Kalonaides." After choosing a name, the Aides write a song that describes their group as well as their name, while also building a sign that represents the group. Most songs refer to events of the summer and include inside jokes.

2022: Kalonaides

2021: Amalgamaides

2019: Ebulaides

2018: Deviaides

2017: Revelaides

2016: Coronaides

2015: Syncopaides

2014: Insigniaides

2013: Liberaides

2012: Constellaides

2011: Exuberaides

2010: Escapaides

2009: Reverberaides

2008: Scintillaides

2007: Jubilaides

2006: Invaiders

2005: Incineraides

2004: Exhileraides

2003: Brigaides

2002: Discombobulaides

2001: Tornaideos

2000: Yippi-Ai-Aides

1999: Milleniaides

1998: Renegaides

1997: Milky Waides

1996: C.I. Aides

1995: Illuminaides

1994: Ricochaides

1993: Hip Hop Hooraides

1992: Grenaides

1991: Masqueraides

1990: Shaides

1989: Decaides

1988: Reggaides

1987: Gatoraides

1986: The Live Aides

1985: Kool - Aides

1984: Band - Aides

References

External links 
 BCCYMCA.org

Becket
1903 establishments in Massachusetts
Buildings and structures in Berkshire County, Massachusetts
YMCA Summer Camps